Xining West Railway Station is a railway station on the Qingzang railway. It serves the suburbs of the city of Xining and is located 12 km from Xining Railway Station.

See also
List of stations on Qingzang railway

Buildings and structures in Xining
Railway stations in Qinghai
Stations on the Qinghai–Tibet Railway